Dolynsky Raion may refer to a raion in Ukraine:
 Dolyna Raion, a former raion of Ivano-Frankivsk Oblast,
 Dolynska Raion, a former raion of Kirovohrad Oblast